Zduńska Wola is the main railway station for the town of Zduńska Wola, Łódź Voivodeship. Initially built in early 1900s to serve Warsaw-Kalisz Railway, it is currently an important interchange, serving trains running on Coal Trunk Railway from Karsznice station toward Sieradz and Kalisz.

For passenger service, it serves as stopping point for PKP Intercity trains running between Wrocław and Warsaw, PolRegio routes from Łódź to Poznań and Wrocław, and ŁKA services to Sieradz. In 2015 the station served as terminus for a commuter trains to Karsznice station.

Train services
The station is served by the following services:

 Intercity services (IC) Wrocław Główny — Łódź — Warszawa Wschodnia
Intercity services (IC) Białystok - Warszawa - Łódź - Ostrów Wielkopolski - Wrocław
Intercity services (IC) Ełk - Białystok - Warszawa - Łódź - Ostrów Wielkopolski - Wrocław
 Intercity services (IC) Zgorzelec - Legnica - Wrocław - Ostrów Wielkopolski - Łódź - Warszawa
 InterRegio services (IR) Ostrów Wielkopolski — Łódź — Warszawa Główna
 InterRegio services (IR) Poznań Główny — Ostrów Wielkopolski — Łódź — Warszawa Główna
 Regiona services (PR) Łódź Kaliska — Ostrów Wielkopolski 
 Regional services (PR) Łódź Kaliska — Ostrów Wielkopolski — Poznań Główny

References 

Railway stations in Poland opened in 1902
Railway stations in Łódź Voivodeship
Railway stations served by Przewozy Regionalne InterRegio
Railway stations served by Łódzka Kolej Aglomeracyjna